F. Murray Abraham is an American actor known for his work in film, television and theatre.

Filmography

Film

Television

Theatre

Broadway

Off-Broadway

West End

References

External links

 
 
 
 
 
 Yahoo! Movies Biography
 F. Murray Abraham  at IMG Artists

Male actor filmographies
American filmographies